Lin Cheng-feng (born 26 December 1982) is a Taiwanese baseball player who currently plays for EDA Rhinos of Chinese Professional Baseball League. He currently serves as a long reliever for the Rhinos.

Early life 
Born in Penghu, Taiwan, Lin was adopted by his foster family, and adopted the family name Hsu as his surname. He later changed his surname to Lin, the family name of his biological family. He began to play baseball at junior level, and moved to Kaohsiung to attend Kaoyuan Vocational School, a secondary school with a long tradition in athletic development in Southern Taiwan. After graduating from Kauyuan, he joined Taiwan Cooperative Bank Baseball Team, an amateur baseball team in Taiwan's Class A amateur baseball league, before passing  the alternative services examination and entered the draft.

Professional career 
Lin was drafted by Uni-President Lions in the second round of 2004's alternative service draft, and spent one year in the minor league as required by regulation. He made his debut on March 22, 2006, after fulfilling his one-year obligation in alternative service. His first win came on June 23, 2007. He started against La New Bears, and pitched five innings while walked six and gave up four hits, including a two-run home run by Huang Lung-Yi. His teammates supported him with eight runs, allowed him to become the second pitcher from Penghu to score a victory in the history of Chinese Professional Baseball League.
In 2012, he was released by Uni-President Lions and later signed by EDA Rhinos.

References 

1982 births
Living people
Baseball pitchers
EDA Rhinos players
Fubon Guardians players
People from Penghu County
Taiwanese baseball players
Uni-President Lions players
Uni-President 7-Eleven Lions players
Fubon Guardians coaches